Samlaya is a large village in Vadodara district in the Indian state of Gujarat.

Demographics
 India census, Samlaya had a population of 2,232. Males constitute 50.90% of the population and females 49.10%. Samlaya has an average literacy rate of 74.50%: male literacy is 87.64%, and female literacy is 60.84%. In Samlaya, 13.22% of the population is under 6 years of age.

Transport

Railway
Samlaya Junction railway station is located on the Western Railway Mumbai – Delhi Segment. It is 47 km from Godhra, 26 km from Vadodara.

References

Villages in Vadodara district